Luminătorul is a periodical of the Metropolis of Bessarabia in Chişinău.

History 

The first edition was printed in January 1908. The first editor in chief was Gurie Grosu. From 1908 on, Grigore D. Constantinescu (1875–1932), Alexandru Baltagă were one of the key aides of Gurie Grosu in the editing and printing of the Romanian language Bessarabian religious journal Luminătorul. In the first period, this journal served also as the eparhial bulletin of Bessarabia.

Footnotes

Bibliography 
 A.T. Un secol cu revista „Luminătorul” .//Misionarul. februarie 2008, Nr. 2 (49) – p. 5

External links
  LUMINĂTORUL
  SLUJITOR LA DOUĂ ALTARE – AL SACRULUI ŞI AL CULTURII

 
Publications established in 1908
Romanian-language newspapers
Newspapers published in Moldova
Mass media in Chișinău
1908 establishments in the Russian Empire